Asociación Deportiva Leones de Occidente are a Salvadoran professional football club based in Metapán, El Salvador.

Recent history
 Segunda División: 2015–

List of Coaches
  Edwin Portillo (July 2015 – Oct 2015)
  Samuel Maldonado (Oct 2015 – June 2016)
  Héctor Jara (July 2016– Oct 2016)
  Edwin Portillo (Oct 2016–)

References

External links
 
 

Football clubs in El Salvador
Association football clubs established in 2015
2015 establishments in El Salvador
Metapán